Winifred Celeste Hervey (born May 14, 1955) is an American television producer and screenwriter. She is sometimes credited as Winifred Hervey Stallworth.

Biography

Career
A graduate of Loyola Marymount University, Hervey began her career in the 1970s as a writer for The Garry Marshall Company where she wrote for the sitcoms Mork & Mindy and The New Odd Couple. During the 1980s, she wrote episodes of Benson and The Cosby Show. She also penned episodes of The Golden Girls, where she also served as co-producer. In 1987, she won an Emmy Award for Outstanding Comedy Series while working on the series.

In the 1990s, she executive produced and wrote for The Fresh Prince of Bel-Air and In the House. In 1996, she created, executive produced and served as head writer for The Steve Harvey Show. The series won three NAACP Image Awards for Outstanding Comedy Series in 2001, 2002, and 2003. In 2002, she produced and wrote six episodes of the UPN series Half & Half for which she was nominated for a BET Comedy Award. In 2004, she was the first black recipient of the Beverly Hills Older American of the Year award.

Awards and nominations

References

External links

1955 births
African-American screenwriters
Screenwriters from California
Television producers from California
American women television producers
American television writers
Emmy Award winners
Living people
Place of birth missing (living people)
American women screenwriters
American women television writers
People from Lompoc, California
21st-century African-American people
21st-century African-American women
20th-century African-American people
20th-century African-American women
African-American women writers